Rural Youth Europe (RYEurope) is a European Non-Governmental Organisation for rural youth.  Founded in 1957, it is an umbrella for European youth organisations working in rural areas.  It was established as “European Committee for Young Farmers and 4H Clubs”   in Rendsburg, Germany in 1957; the name “Rural Youth Europe” was adopted in 2003.

Aims 
Rural Youth Europe aims to educate and train young people and create an awareness of rural and social issues. It also encourages rural populations and industry and supports the development of new rural youth organisations.

In addition, Rural Youth Europe wants to take a role in the development of environmental and agricultural issues and policies as well as network with other European NGOs. It lobbies and highlights the problems and needs of rural youth to focus the attention of international and national bodies, as well as the general public.

Government 
The Board consists of representatives of the regions (United Kingdom and Ireland, Central Europe, the Nordic countries and Eastern Europe), a board member for special interests, a Chairperson and a Vice-Chairperson. The members are elected by the General Assembly for a term of 2 years.  
The office  is located in Helsinki, Finland.

Leadership
The Chairs of the organisation have been:
 

 
The  Secretary Generals  have been:

Membership 

The group has 22 member organisations in 20 countries and over 500,000 youth participants who are members of Rural Youth Associations, Young Farmers' Clubs and 4H. It is divided into 4 regional groups:

Regional Group I 

 National Federation of Young Farmers' Clubs (NFYFC), England
 Macra na Feirme, Ireland
 Young Farmers' Clubs of Ulster (YFCU), Northern Ireland
 Scottish Association of Young Farmers' Clubs (SAYFC), Scotland
 Wales YFC / CFFI Cymru, Wales

Regional Group II 

 Landjugend Österreich (ÖLJ), Austria
 Bund der Deutschen Landjugend (BDL), Germany
 Agricultural and Rural Youth Association (AGRYA), Hungary
 South Tyrol Young Farmers (SBJ), Italy
 Stichting Plattelandsjongeren (Stichting Plattelandsjongeren) Netherlands
 Slovenian Rural Youth (ZSPM) Slovenia
 Schweizerische Landjugendvereinigung (SLJV), Switzerland

Regional Group III 

 Danmarks Landboungdom + Danish 4H, Denmark
 Suomen 4H-liitto, Finland
 Finlands Svenska 4H, Finland
 Norske 4H, Norway
 Norges Bygdeungdomslag, Norway
 Sveriges 4H, Sweden

Regional Group IV 

 Eesti 4H, Estonia
 Latvian 4H, Latvia
 Latvian Young Farmers' Club, (JZK), Latvia
 Federation of Youth Clubs of Armenia, (FYCA) Armenia

Activities 
Rural Youth Europe arranges yearly seminars, educational courses and a rally to discuss and share knowledge on topics such as rural development, youth participation, intercultural dialogue, leadership and human rights.

European Rallies

References

External links
 http://ruralyoutheurope.com/

Rural society in Europe
Youth organizations based in Europe
Youth organisations based in Finland
International nongovernmental youth organizations